John L. Volakis (Greek: Ιωάννης Λ. Βολάκης) is a Greek-born American engineer, educator and author. He is the Dean of the College of Engineering and Computing at Florida International University (FIU). He was born in Chios, Greece on May 13, 1956, and immigrated to the United States in 1973. He is an IEEE, ACES, AAAS and NAI Fellow and a recipient of the URSI Gold Medal. He served as the IEEE Antennas and Propagation Society President (2004), and as chair and Vice Chair of the International Radio Science Union (URSI), Commission B (2017-2023).

He carried out innovations and research on diffraction theory, antennas, medical sensing, computational methods, electromagnetic compatibility and interference, propagation, design optimization, Radio Frequency (RF) materials and metamaterials, Radio Frequency Identifications (RFIDs), millimeter waves and terahertz, body-worn wireless technologies, and multi-physics engineering.

Early life 
John (Ioannis) Volakis was born on 13 May 1956 in Chios, Greece. He grew up in the small farming village of Olympi, part of the mastic villages located south of the island of Chios. During his early years, he enjoyed working in olive groves, wheat fields and the unique mastic trees of the region. When 12 years old, he moved to the city of Chios to attend the historic 1st gymnasium (now 1st lyceum). He immigrated to the United States in 1973, and after spending a few months in the Warren G. Harding High School to acquire a working knowledge of the English language, he went on to pursue his childhood dream of becoming an electrical engineer.

Education and Career 

John Volakis received his M.Sc. and Ph.D. degrees from The Ohio State University, Columbus, OH in 1979 and 1982, respectively. He obtained his bachelor's degree from Youngstown State University in 1978 Summa Cum Laude. He started his career at Rockwell International-North American Aircraft Operations (1982–1984), now Boeing Integrated Defense Systems. In 1984, he was appointed assistant professor at The University of Michigan, Ann Arbor, becoming a full Professor in 1994. He also served as the Director of the Radiation Laboratory from 1998 to 2000. From January 2003 to August 2017, he was the Roy and Lois Chope Chair Professor of Engineering at The Ohio State University (OSU) and served as the Director of the ElectroScience Laboratory (2003-2016). Since August 2017, he is the Dean of the College of Engineering and Computing at Florida International University (FIU) and a professor at the Department of Electrical and Computer Engineering.

Volakis is the author of 8 books, including the Antenna Handbook, which is referred to as the “antenna bible,” a key book on finite element methods, small antennas, integral equations methods, and wearable electronics. He has also mentored nearly 100 doctoral candidates and postdoctoral researchers and has co-written 43 papers that were recipient of best paper awards. Volakis' research team is recognized for introducing and/or developing a hybrid finite method for microwave engineering, which is now the de facto method in commercial RF design packages, novel composite materials for antennas  & sensor miniaturization, a new class of wideband conformal antennas and arrays with over 30:1 of contiguous bandwidth, referred to as tightly coupled dipole antennas and has already garnered over 9 million citations, textile surfaces for wearable electronics and sensors, battery-less and wireless medical implants  for non-invasive brain signal collection, diffraction coefficients for material coated edges, and model-scaled radar scattering verification methods.

Bibliography

References 

1956 births
Living people
Youngstown State University alumni
Ohio State University College of Engineering alumni
Florida International University faculty
Fellow Members of the IEEE
Fellows of the National Academy of Inventors
American electrical engineers
Greek emigrants to the United States
Fellows of the American Association for the Advancement of Science
University of Michigan faculty
Ohio State University faculty
Microwave engineers
American telecommunications engineers